Below are the results of season three of the World Poker Tour television series (2004–2005).

Results

Grand Prix de Paris

 Casino: Aviation Club de France, Paris
 Buy-in: €10,000
 5-Day Event: July 17, 2004 to July 21, 2004
 Number of Entries: 205
 Total Prize Pool: €1,957,750
 Number of Payouts: 27

Mirage Poker Showdown
 Casino: The Mirage, Paradise, Nevada
 Buy-in: $10,000
 4-Day Event: July 29, 2004 to August 1, 2004
 Number of Entries: 281
 Total Prize Pool: $2,725,200
 Number of Payouts: 27

Legends of Poker

 Casino: Bicycle Casino, Los Angeles
 Buy-in: $5,000
 4-Day Event: August 28, 2004 to August 31, 2004
 Number of Entries: 667
 Total Prize Pool: $3,335,000
 Number of Payouts: 63
 Winning Hand:

Borgata Poker Open

 Casino: Borgata, Atlantic City
 Buy-in: $10,000
 4-Day Event: September 19, 2004 to September 22, 2004
 Number of Entries: 302
 Total Prize Pool: $3,020,000
 Number of Payouts: 27
 Winning Hand:

Ultimate Poker Classic

 Casino: Radisson Aruba Resort & Casino, Palm Beach, Aruba
 Buy-in: $6,000
 6-Day Event: September 26, 2004 to October 1, 2004
 Number of Entries: 647
 Total Prize Pool: $3,879,000
 Number of Payouts: 200

Festa Al Lago (Doyle Brunson North American Poker Championship)

 Casino: Bellagio, Las Vegas 
 Buy-in: $10,000
 4-Day Event: October 19, 2004 to October 22, 2004
 Number of Entries: 312
 Total Prize Pool: $3,026,400
 Number of Payouts: 50
 Winning Hand:

World Poker Finals

 Casino: Foxwoods, Mashantucket, Connecticut
 Buy-in: $10,000
 5-Day Event: November 13, 2004 to November 17, 2004
 Number of Entries: 674
 Total Prize Pool: $6,765,000
 Number of Payouts: 60
 Winning Hand: 6-7

Five Diamond World Poker Classic

 Casino: Bellagio, Las Vegas 
 Buy-in: $15,000
 5-Day Event: December 14, 2004 to December 18, 2004
 Number of Entries: 376
 Total Prize Pool: $5,470,800
 Number of Payouts: 50
 Winning Hand: K-7

PokerStars Caribbean Poker Adventure

 Casino: Atlantis, Paradise Island, Bahamas
 Buy-in: $7,800 
 4-Day Event: January 8, 2005 to January 11, 2005
 Number of Entries: 461
 Total Prize Pool: $3,595,600
 Number of Payouts: 75

World Poker Open

 Casino: Gold Strike Resort and Casino, Tunica
 Buy-in: $10,000
 4-Day Event: January 24, 2005 to January 27, 2005
 Number of Entries: 512
 Total Prize Pool: $4,832,773
 Number of Payouts: 44
 Winning Hand: A-10

L.A. Poker Classic

 Casino: Commerce Casino, Los Angeles 
 Buy-in: $10,000
 5-Day Event: February 18, 2005 to February 22, 2005
 Number of Entries: 538
 Total Prize Pool: $5,166,414
 Number of Payouts: 45
 Winning Hand: A-9

L.A. Poker Classic
 Casino: Commerce Casino, Los Angeles
 Buy-in:
 2-Day Event: February 25, 2005
 Number of Entries: 238
 Total Prize Pool:
 Number of Payouts:
 Winning Hand:

Bay 101 Shooting Star

 Casino: Bay 101, San Jose, California
 Buy-in: $10,000
 5-Day Event: March 7, 2005 to March 11, 2005
 Number of Entries: 438
 Total Prize Pool: $4,070,000
 Number of Payouts: 45
 Winning Hand: 4-3

Party Poker Million

 Buy-in: $10,000 
 5-Day Event: March 19, 2005 to March 23, 2005
 Number of Entries: 735
 Total Prize Pool: $7,430,000
 Number of Payouts: 180
 Winning Hand: J-2

 This event, which was limit hold 'em,  had the largest prize pool in history for a tournament that was not played at no-limit hold 'em.

World Poker Challenge

 Casino: Reno Hilton, Reno
 Buy-in: $5,000
 4-Day Event: March 29, 2005 to April 1, 2005
 Number of Entries: 345
 Total Prize Pool: $1,725,350
 Number of Payouts: 27
 Winning Hand:

WPT Championship

 Casino: Bellagio, Las Vegas 
 Buy-in: $25,000
 7-Day Event: April 18, 2005 to April 24, 2005
 Number of Entries: 453
 Total Prize Pool: $10,961,000
 Number of Payouts: 100
 Winning Hand: K-J

Other Events
During season 3 of the WPT there was one special event that did not apply to the Player of the Year standings:
 The WPT Invitational - February 23–24, 2005 - Commerce Casino - postscript to Event #11: L.A. Poker Classic

References 

World Poker Tour
2004 in poker
2005 in poker